Durga Nagar Part-V is a census town in Cachar district  in the state of Assam, India.

Demographics
 India census, Durga Nagar Part-V had a population of 7425. Males constitute 50% of the population and females 50%. Durga Nagar Part-V has an average literacy rate of 80%, higher than the national average of 59.5%: male literacy is 82% and, female literacy is 78%. In Durga Nagar Part-V, 11% of the population is under 6 years of age.

References

Cities and towns in Cachar district
Silchar